Macaranga denticulata is a species of Asian small trees in the family Euphorbiaceae and tribe Acalypheae, found especially in secondary tropical forests.  No subspecies are listed in the Catalogue of Life and the recorded distribution includes: India, southern China,  Indo-China and western Malesia.

Gallery

References

External links 
 
 

denticulata
 Flora of Indo-China
 Flora of Malesia